"A Late Encounter with the Enemy" is a short story by Flannery O'Connor. It was written in 1953 and published in the September 1953 issue of Harper’s Bazaar, appearing later in her short story collection A Good Man Is Hard to Find (1955). It is her only story dealing with the American Civil War. A devout Roman Catholic, O'Connor often used religious themes in her work.

Plot summary 
General George Poker Sash is a 104-year-old veteran of the American Civil War who remembers very little about the War but is currently celebrated for his longevity. He has been invited to various public celebrations where he covets the attention, particularly, from beautiful women in the crowd, and he has an inflated image of himself despite his decrepit condition. The General's 62-year-old granddaughter, Sally Poker, prays every night that he lives long enough to sit on the stage during her college graduation so that everyone can see her strong heritage and superiority. The general is wheeled onto the stage by Sally's young nephew, John Wesley, and is barely aware of the scene. Just as his granddaughter is graduating, the General experiences a revelation that he must look beyond the past. He then dies on stage as his granddaughter is graduating, although this is not immediately evident. It is unclear if Sally gets beyond her prideful idolatry about her family heritage.

Background 
The story is loosely based upon a newspaper article about a Civil War veteran attending his wife's graduation that Flannery O'Connor read in the early 1950s. It is also the only O'Connor story to deal explicitly with a subject that is important to the works of many Southern writers – the Civil War.

References

Short stories by Flannery O'Connor
1953 short stories
Southern Gothic short stories